The 2013–14 Copa Argentina was the fifth edition of the Copa Argentina, and the third since the relaunch of the tournament in 2011. The competition began on October 29, 2013. Arsenal was the defending champion, but were eliminated by Instituto in the Round of 32. In the final, Huracán won the tournament beating Rosario Central on penalties to win their first title. By winning the competition, Huracán won the right to play the 2015 Copa Libertadores, and the 2014 Supercopa Argentina.

Teams
Two hundred and sixty-one teams will take part in this competition. All the teams from the Primera División (20), Primera B Nacional (22), Primera B Metropolitana (21), Torneo Argentino A (24), Primera C (20), Torneo Argentino B (136), and Primera D (18).

Teams in bold are still in competition

Primera División

 All Boys
 Argentinos Juniors
 Arsenal (defending champions)
 Atlético de Rafaela
 Belgrano
 Boca Juniors
 Colón
 Estudiantes (LP)
 Gimnasia y Esgrima (LP)
 Godoy Cruz
 Lanús
 Newell's Old Boys
 Olimpo
 Quilmes
 Racing
 River Plate
 Rosario Central
 San Lorenzo
 Tigre
 Vélez Sársfield

Primera B Nacional

 Aldosivi
 Almirante Brown
 Atlético Tucumán
 Banfield
 Boca Unidos
 Brown
 Crucero del Norte
 Defensa y Justicia
 Douglas Haig
 Ferro Carril Oeste
 Gimnasia y Esgrima (J)
 Huracán
 Independiente
 Independiente Rivadavia
 Instituto
 Patronato
 San Martín (SJ)
 Sarmiento (J)
 Sportivo Belgrano
 Talleres (C)
 Unión
 Villa San Carlos

Primera B Metropolitana

 Acassuso
 Almagro
 Atlanta
 Barracas Central
 Chacarita Juniors
 Colegiales
 Comunicaciones
 Defensores de Belgrano
 Deportivo Armenio
 Deportivo Merlo
 Deportivo Morón
 Estudiantes (BA)
 Fénix
 Flandria
 Los Andes
 Nueva Chicago
 Platense
 Temperley
 Tristán Suárez
 UAI Urquiza
 Villa Dálmine

Torneo Argentino A

 Alvarado
 Central Córdoba (SdE)
 Central Norte
 Chaco For Ever
 Cipolletti
 CAI
 Defensores de Belgrano (VR)
 Deportivo Maipú
 Estudiantes (SL)
 Gimnasia y Esgrima (CdU)
 Gimnasia y Tiro
 Guaraní Antonio Franco
 Guillermo Brown
 Juventud Antoniana
 Juventud Unida (G)
 Juventud Unida Universitario
 Libertad (S)
 Racing (O)
 Rivadavia (L)
 San Jorge (T)
 San Martín (T)
 Santamarina
 Tiro Federal
 Unión (MdP)

Primera C

 Argentino (M)
 Argentino (Q)
 Berazategui
 Central Córdoba (R)
 Defensores de Cambaceres
 Defensores Unidos
 Deportivo Español
 Dock Sud
 Excursionistas
 Ferrocarril Midland
 General Lamadrid
 Ituzaingó
 J. J. de Urquiza
 Laferrere
 Liniers
 Luján
 Sacachispas
 San Telmo
 Sportivo Italiano
 Talleres (RE)

Torneo Argentino B

 9 de Julio (M)
 9 de Julio (R)
 25 de Mayo (LP)
 Agropecuario
 Alianza (CM)
 Alianza (CC)
 Alumni (VM)
 Altos Hornos Zapla
 América (GP)
 Andes FBC
 Aprendices Casildenses
 Argentino Peñarol
 Argentino Quilmes (R)
 Argentinos (VdM)
 Atenas (P)
 Atlético Adelante
 Atlético Amalia
 Atlético Argentino (M)
 Atlético Camioneros
 Atlético Chicoana
 Atlético Concepción (T)
 Atlético Laguna Blanca
 Atlético Palmira
 Atlético Paraná
 Atlético Policial (C)
 Atlético Regina
 Bella Vista (BB)
 Belgrano (E)
 Belgrano (P)
 Belgrano (Z)
 Ben Hur
 Boca (RG)
 Camioneros Argentinos
 CEC (Mdza)
 Central Goya
 Círculo Italiano
 Colegiales (C)
 Concepción FC
 Coronel Aguirre
 Defensores de Buena Parada
 Defensores de La Boca (LR)
 Defensores de Salto
 Deportivo Achirense
 Deportivo Aguilares
 Deportivo Curupay
 Deportivo Fontana
 Deportivo Guaymallén
 Deportivo Lastenia
 Deportivo Madryn
 Deportivo Montecaseros
 Deportivo Patagones
 Deportivo Río Dorado
 Deportivo Roca
 Deportivo Tabacal
 Desamparados (SJ)
 Estudiantes (RC)
 Estudiantes Unidos
 Everton
 Ex Alumnos Escuela N°185
 FC Tres Algarrobos
 Ferro Carril Oeste (GP)
 Ferro Carril Sud
 Ferroviario (C)
 General Paz Juniors
 General Rojo
 Germinal
 Gimnasia y Esgrima (Mza)
 Gutiérrez
 Herminio Arrieta
 Huracán (CR)
 Huracán de Goya
 Huracán (SR)
 Independiente (C)
 Independiente (F)
 Independiente (LR)
 Independiente (N)
 Independiente (RC)
 Independiente de Villa Obrera
 Instituto Santiago
 Jorge Newbery (J)
 Jorge Newbery (VM)
 Jorge Newbery (VT)
 Jorge Ross
 Juventud (P)
 Juventud Alianza
 Kimberley
 Las Palmas
 Leonardo Murialdo
 Libertad (S)
 Liniers (BB)
 Mitre (S)
 Mitre (SdE)
 Monterrico San Vicente
 Náutico Hacoaj
 Once Tigres
 Petrolero Argentino
 Petrolero Austral
 Progreso (RdlF)
 Racing (C)
 Racing (T)
 Resistencia Central
 San Jorge (SF)
 San Lorenzo (A)
 San Martín (F)
 San Martín (M)
 San Martín (MC)
 Sanjustino
 Sarmiento (A)
 Sarmiento (L)
 Sarmiento (R)
 Sarmiento (SdE)
 Sol de América (F)
 Sol de Mayo
 Sport Club Pacífico
 Sportivo Barracas (C)
 Sportivo Del Bono
 Sportivo Fernández
 Sportivo Las Parejas
 Sportivo Patria
 Sportivo Rivadavia (VT)
 Sports (S)
 Talleres (P)
 Textil Mandiyú
 Tiro Federal (BB)
 Tiro Federal (M)
 Tiro y Gimnasia (J)
 Trinidad
 Unión Aconquija
 Unión (S)
 Unión (VK)
 Unión Güemes
 Unión Santiago
 Viale FBC
 Villa Congreso
 Villa Cubas (C)
 Villa Mitre

Primera D

 Argentino (R)
 Atlas
 Cañuelas
 Central Ballester
 Centro Español
 Claypole
 Deportivo Paraguayo
 Deportivo Riestra
 El Porvenir
 Juventud Unida
 Leandro N. Alem
 Lugano
 Muñiz
 San Martín (B)
 San Miguel
 Sportivo Barracas
 Victoriano Arenas
 Yupanqui

Regional Preliminary Round

This round is organized by the Consejo Federal.

Regional Preliminary Round I 

In this round, 80 teams from the Torneo Argentino B participated. The round was contested between October 29 and November 6, in a single match knock-out format. The 40 winning teams advanced to the next round.

Regional Preliminary Round II 

This round is contested by the 40 qualified teams from the Regional Preliminary Round I and the remaining 56 teams from the Torneo Argentino B. It will be played between November 12 and November 20, in a single match knock-out format. The 48 winning teams will advance to the next round.

Regional Preliminary Round III 

This round is contested by the winning 48 teams from the Regional Preliminary Round II. The round will be played on November 27 in a single match knock-out format. The 24 winning teams will advance to the Regional Initial Round.

Regional Initial Round 

This round is organized by the Consejo Federal.

Regional Initial Round I 

This round is composed of two zones:

Torneo Argentino B Zone 

In this zone, the 24 qualified teams from the Regional Preliminary Round III will take part. The matches will be played on December 10 in a single match knock-out format. The 12 winning teams will advance to the Regional Initial Round II.

Torneo Argentino A Zone 

In this zone, all 24 teams from the Torneo Argentino A will participate. The matches will be played between November 5 and 20, in a single match knock-out format. The 12 winning teams will advance to the Regional Initial Round II.

Regional Initial Round II 

This round is composed of two zones:

Torneo Argentino B Zone 

In this zone, the 12 qualified teams from the first Regional Initial Round's Argentino B zone will take part. The matches are to be played between January 29 and February 5 in a single match knock-out format. The 6 winning teams will advance to the Regional Initial Round III.

Torneo Argentino A Zone 

In this zone, the 12 qualified teams from the first Regional Initial Round's Argentino A zone will take part. The matches will be played between November 20 and December 4, in a single match knock-out format. The 6 winning teams will advance to the Regional Initial Round III.

Regional Initial Round III 

All 12 teams qualified from the Regional Initial Round II (6 from each zone) will participate in this round. The matches will be played on February 12. Every match will have an Argentino A team facing an Argentino B team. The winners will advance to the Final Round.

Metropolitan Initial Round 

This round is organized directly by the Asociación del Fútbol Argentino

Metropolitan Initial Round I 

In this round, all Primera D teams will participate as well as 10 teams from Primera C (the two teams promoted from Primera D for the 2013/14 season, and the 8 teams with the worst points per match average that weren't relegated at the end of the  2012/13 season). The matches will be played between November 6 and 14, in a single match knock-out format. The 14 winning teams will advance to the Metropolitan Initial Round II.

Metropolitan Initial Round II 

This round will be composed of two zones:

Primera C/D Zone 

This zone will have the 14 teams qualified from the previous round, as well as the 10 remaining Primera C teams. The matches will be played in a single match knock-out format. The winners will advance to the Metropolitan Initial Round III.

Primera B Metropolitana Zone 

This zone will have 18 teams from the Primera B Metropolitana (the two teams just promoted from the Primera C and the 14 teams with the worst points per game average that weren't relegated by the end of the 2012/13 season). The matches will be played on November 20 in a single match knock-out format. The winners will advance to the Metropolitan Initial Round III.

Metropolitan Initial Round III 

Like the previous round, there will be two zones:

Primera C/D Zone 

The qualified 12 Primera C/D Zone teams from the previous round will participate. The matches will be played in a single match knock-out format. The winners will advance to the Metropolitan Initial Round IV.

Primera B Metropolitana Zone 

The qualified 9 B Metropolitana Zone teams from the previous round will participate along with the 3 remaining teams (Estudiantes (BA), Atlanta, Platense). The matches will be played in a single match knock-out format. The winners will advance to the Metropolitan Initial Round IV.

Metropolitan Initial Round IV 

All 12 qualified teams from the previous will participate. The matches will be played in a single match knock-out format. The winners will advance to the Final Round.

Final round

Final Round I 
This round involves the 6 teams qualified from the Regional Initial Round, 6 teams qualified from the Metropolitan Initial Round and 8 clubs from the Primera B Nacional: the four newly promoted to the division (Brown de Adrogué, Sportivo Belgrano, Talleres (C) and Villa San Carlos) and the four teams with the worst point average that weren't relegated at the end of the 2012/13 season (Aldosivi, Crucero del Norte, Ferro Carril Oeste and Instituto). The round was contested between March 12 and April 2, in a single knock-out match format. The 10 winning teams advanced to the next round.

Final Round II 

This round will have the 10 qualified teams from the Final Round I and the rest of the Nacional B teams, The round was contested between April 9 and May 7, in a single knock-out match format. The 12 winning teams will advance to the Round of 32.

Upper bracket

Lower bracket

Round of 32 

This round had the 12 qualified teams from the Final Round II and the twenty (20) teams  of Primera División, The round was contested between July 17 and August 12, in a single knock-out match format. The 16 winning teams advanced to the Round of 16.

Round of 16 

This round had the 16 qualified teams from the Round of 32. The round was contested between August 19 and October 1, in a single knock-out match format. The 8 winning teams advanced to the Quarterfinals.

Quarterfinals

This round had the 8 qualified teams from the Round of 16. The round was contested between October 8 and October 22, in a single knock-out match format. The 4 winning teams advanced to the Semifinals.

Semifinals

This round had the 4 qualified teams from the Quarterfinals. The round was contested on November 19 in a single knock-out match format. The 2 winning teams advanced to the Final.

Final

Top goalscorers

Note: Players and teams in bold are still active in the competition.

References

External links
Official site 
Copa Argentina on the Argentine Football Association's website 

2013–14 in Argentine football
2013
2013–14 domestic association football cups